Dámaso Blanco Caripe (born December 11, 1941 in Curiepe, Miranda State, Venezuela), is a former Major League Baseball third baseman/shortstop and right-handed batter who played for the San Francisco Giants (1972–74). In 1977, at the age of 36, he retired from baseball and began serving as a scout for the Cincinnati Reds for a short period of time. On his return to Venezuela, he began a successful career as commentator in the media.

Life and career
Blanco was the classic example of the fine fielder with a light bat. He was a decent hitter in the minors, where his batting and on-base averages were both quite respectable. He was 7-for-20 (.350) in 1972 (his first two hits coming in the same game, against Tom Phoebus of the Chicago Cubs on June 11), but was 0-for-13 in limited opportunities the next two seasons.

In parts of three seasons as a backup with the Giants, Blanco hit .212 (7-for-33) with two runs batted in, nine runs, one double and 3 stolen bases in 72 games.  In the field he handled 46 of 48 total chances successfully (.958) and participated in 3 double plays.

He resumed his career in the Venezuela League, hitting .272 (704-for-2623) with 198 RBI, 289 runs, 72 doubles, 28 triples, and 70 steals in 754 games (1960–77).

After retiring at age 36, Blanco scouted briefly for the Cincinnati Reds before beginning a successful career as a journalist and baseball broadcaster in his native Venezuela.

In 2014, Blanco gained induction in the Venezuelan Baseball Hall of Fame and Museum. He was inducted as well in the Hall in 2015, when the entire 1959 Pan American Games champion team was honored.

See also
 List of players from Venezuela in Major League Baseball

References

External links
Career statistics and player information from Baseball-Reference, or Baseball-Reference (Minors), or Retrosheet
Venezuelan Professional Baseball League

1941 births
Amarillo Giants players
Baseball announcers
Baseball players at the 1959 Pan American Games
Decatur Commodores players
El Paso Sun Kings players
Eugene Emeralds players
Fresno Giants players
Industriales de Valencia players
Leones del Caracas players
Licoreros de Pampero players
Living people
Major League Baseball infielders
Major League Baseball players from Venezuela
Navegantes del Magallanes players
Pan American Games gold medalists for Venezuela
Pan American Games medalists in baseball
People from Miranda (state)
Phoenix Giants players
San Francisco Giants players
Springfield Giants players
Tacoma Giants players
Tiburones de La Guaira players
Tigres de Aragua players
Venezuelan expatriate baseball players in the United States
Waterbury Giants players
Medalists at the 1959 Pan American Games